Jannet Alegría Peña (born August 30, 1987, in San Juan del Río, Mexico) is Mexican taekwondo practitioner.

In 2011, she participated at the 2011 Pan American Games where she won the bronze medal at the -49 kg category. Later in 2012 she qualified directly to participate at the 2012 Summer Olympics, making her Olympic debut.  She beat Raya Hatahet in her first match, before losing to Brigitte Yagüe in the quarter-final.  In the repechage, she beat Carolena Carstens, before losing her bronze medal match to Lucija Zaninović in sudden death overtime.

References

1987 births
Living people
Mexican female taekwondo practitioners
Olympic taekwondo practitioners of Mexico
Taekwondo practitioners at the 2011 Pan American Games
Taekwondo practitioners at the 2012 Summer Olympics
Pan American Games bronze medalists for Mexico
Pan American Games medalists in taekwondo
Universiade medalists in taekwondo
Universiade bronze medalists for Mexico
Medalists at the 2011 Pan American Games
Sportspeople from Querétaro
People from San Juan del Río
20th-century Mexican women
21st-century Mexican women